Denys Anatoliyovych Shmyhal (born 15 October 1975) is a Ukrainian politician and entrepreneur who is the current Prime Minister of Ukraine since 2020. Prior to his appointment as prime minister, Shmyhal was the governor of Ivano-Frankivsk Oblast and an acting vice prime minister in the Honcharuk Government.

As a Prime Minister, Shmyhal has been in charge of handling the response to the COVID-19 pandemic in Ukraine.

Biography 
Shmyhal’s parents are Anatoly Ivanovich and Irina Feliksovna. 

In 1997, Shmyhal graduated from the Lviv Polytechnic. He holds the title of Candidate of Economic Sciences (2003). From his graduation in 1997 until September 2005, Shmyhal worked as an accountant in various companies. From September 2005 to June 2006, Shmyhal was Deputy General Director of a company called "LA DIS". From June 2006 to August 2008, he was Director for the investment company "Comfort-Invest". From September 2008 to September 2009, Shmyhal was General Director of a company called "ROSANINVEST LLC".

Shmyhal worked in multiple leading political roles in Ukraine's Lviv Oblast from 2009 until December 2013. Firstly, as the Head of the Department of Economics at the Lviv Oblast Administration between 2009 and 2011. It is there were he met and worked with Oleh Nemchinov who would, in 2020, become Minister of the Cabinet of Ministers in the Shmyhal Government. Shmyhal then became the Head of the Department of Economics and Industrial Policy for the whole of 2012. In 2013, he was Head of the Department of Economic Development, Investment, Trade and Industry.

For the first four months of 2014, Shmyhal was a consultant to a People's Deputy of Ukraine.

From May 2014 to December 2014, Shmyhal worked as Deputy Head of the Lviv Oblast regional office of the Ministry of Revenues and Duties.

He served as Vice President of Lviv-based frozen goods distributor TVK Lvivkholod from 2015 to 2017.

From 2018 to 2019, Shmyhal served as Director of the Burshtyn TES which is the largest electricity producer in Ivano-Frankivsk, and is part of Rinat Akhmetov's holdings.

From 1 August 2019 until his ministerial appointment, Shmyhal was the Governor of Ivano-Frankivsk Oblast.

On 4 February 2020, he was appointed Minister of Regional Development.

Shmyhal replaced Oleksiy Honcharuk as the prime minister of Ukraine in March 2020.

In 2021, 46-year-old Denys Shmyhal entered the TOP-100 most influential Ukrainians according to the weekly magazine Focus. The Prime Minister was given the 7th place in the rating. Shmyhal's success is explained by the support of Volodymyr Zelenskyy and the initiatives of the presidential office.

Personal life
Shmyhal is married to Kateryna Shmyhal. They have two daughters. Kateryna is a former co-owner of the Lviv “Kamyanetsky Bakery” and a local NextBike bike rental. She sold her shares in these companies in 2019.

See also 
 Honcharuk Government
 Shmyhal Government

References

External links 
 
 
 
 

1975 births
Living people
21st-century Ukrainian businesspeople
21st-century Ukrainian politicians
Businesspeople from Lviv
Governors of Ivano-Frankivsk Oblast
Independent politicians in Ukraine
Lviv Polytechnic alumni
National Security and Defense Council of Ukraine
Politicians from Lviv
Prime Ministers of Ukraine
Regional development and construction ministers of Ukraine
Vice Prime Ministers of Ukraine